Natalia Elisante Sulle (born 19 July 1988) is a Tanzanian long-distance runner. She competed in the senior women's race at the 2019 IAAF World Cross Country Championships held in Aarhus, Denmark. She finished in 68th place.

In 2019, she represented Tanzania at the African Games held in Rabat, Morocco. She competed in the women's half marathon and she finished in 7th place with a time of 1:14:33.

References

External links 
 

Living people
1988 births
Place of birth missing (living people)
Tanzanian female long-distance runners
Tanzanian female cross country runners
African Games competitors for Tanzania
Athletes (track and field) at the 2019 African Games
20th-century Tanzanian women
21st-century Tanzanian women